Milan Petržela (born 19 June 1983) is a Czech professional footballer who plays as a winger for Czech First League club 1. FC Slovácko. He has played for the Czech Republic national team.

Career
Petržela grew up in the South Moravian village Hoštice-Heroltice.

In August 2003 he moved to 1. FC Slovácko of the Czech First League. There he played 70 games in three years and in the summer of 2006 he was bought by Sparta Prague. They however loaned him out to FK Jablonec where he made 24 appearances. He subsequently signed with Viktoria Plzeň, where he won the Czech Cup in 2010 and the Czech First League in 2011.

After an unsuccessful season with FC Augsburg, Petržela returned to Viktoria Plzeň in June 2013. On 6 November 2022, he set a new Czech First League record with 465 appearances, when he surprassed Jaroslav Šilhavý with 464 appearances.

Career statistics

Honours
Viktoria Plzeň
 Czech First League: 2010–11
 Czech Cup: 2009–10
 Czech Republic Football Supercup: 2011

References

External links
 
 
 Milan Petržela at Sparta Prague

Living people
1983 births
People from Vyškov District
Sportspeople from the South Moravian Region
Czech footballers
Association football midfielders
Czech Republic international footballers
Czech Republic under-21 international footballers
Czech Republic youth international footballers
UEFA Euro 2012 players
Czech First League players
Bundesliga players
FK Jablonec players
AC Sparta Prague players
1. FC Slovácko players
FC Viktoria Plzeň players
FK Drnovice players
FC Augsburg players
Czech expatriate footballers
Czech expatriate sportspeople in Germany
Expatriate footballers in Germany